William Ó Con Ceanainn, Lord of Uí Díarmata, died in 1478.

Overview

Sub anno 1478, the Annals of the Four Masters state that

"Thomas O'Concannon, Lord of Hy-Diarmada, was slain by the son of his own brother."

He was succeeded by William, who died later the same year, who was in turn succeeded by his son, Davock.

References

 Vol. 2 (AD 903–1171): edition and translation
 Annals of Ulster at CELT: Corpus of Electronic Texts at University College Cork
 Annals of Tigernach at CELT: Corpus of Electronic Texts at University College Cork

People from County Galway
Medieval Gaels from Ireland
Irish lords
1478 deaths
15th-century Irish people
Year of birth unknown